Jaandaar ( Lively) is a 1979 Hindi-language action film, produced and directed by S.K. Lutha under the Kareer Films banner. It stars Vinod Mehra, Bindiya Goswami, Amjad Khan, Mahendra Sandhu  while  Jeetendra has given a special appearance and the music was composed by Kalyanji Virji Shah.

Plot
Seth Dharmadas (Amjad Khan) is an honorable-seeming hoodlum. He steals an antique charm from a temple following the death of the Priest (Satyendra Kapoor) and his wife (Urmila Bhatt). Here, Dharmadas's mother Kamla Devi (Nirupa Roy) realizes the cold-heartedness of her son. So, he forces her out and absconds with his daughter Radha. Right now, as a penance, Kamla Devi adopts the bereaved priest's sons Raju and Birju and leaves the town when, unfortunately, Birju is detached. Years roll by, Kamla Devi ascertains Raju as an honest police officer Raj Kumar Varma (Vinod Mehra) whereas Birju (Mahendra Sandhu) becomes a ruffian with self-righteousness and destiny makes the brothers rivals. Besides, Dharmadas catches the summit in the netherworld. Meanwhile, Raju and Radha (Bindiya Goswami) fall in love. So, enraged Dharmadas intrigues and indicts Raju in an offense and he is sentenced. In jail, Raju is acquainted with a trunk driver Gulkhan (Jeetendra) whom he aided previously. With his help, Raju escapes for proving his innocence for which he associates with Dharmadas in disguise. Thereupon, he entrusts a task of seizing Birju where a clash arises where they identify themselves as brothers. At last, Raju and Birju flares-up on Dharmadas when Gulkhan sacrifices his life while guarding Raju. Finally, the movie the ends Kamla Devi eliminating Dharmadas.

Cast
Vinod Mehra as Inspector Raj Kumar Verma			
Bindiya Goswami as Radha
Mahendra Sandhu as Birju
Aruna Irani as Birju's Girlfriend
Amjad Khan as Dharamdas
Jeetendra as Gul Khan 
Satyendra Kapoor as Priest						
Sujit Kumar as Robert D'Souza	
Raza Murad as Sulaiman			
Navin Nischol as Advocate	
Paidi Jairaj as Mr. Sinha
Dhumal as a Police constable 
Birbal as Police Constable
Nirupa Roy	as Kamla 	
Jayshree T.			
Komilla Wirk	
Urmila Bhatt as Priest's Wife

Soundtrack

External links
 

1979 films
1970s Hindi-language films
Indian action films
1979 action films